General Sir Frederick Alfred Pile, 2nd Baronet,  (14 September 1884 – 14 November 1976) was a senior British Army officer who served in both World Wars. In the Second World War he was General Officer Commanding Anti-Aircraft Command, one of the elements that protected Britain from aerial attack.

Early life 
Pile was born in Dublin as the second child of Sir Thomas Devereux Pile, 1st Baronet and his wife, Caroline Maude Nicholson, Sir Thomas served as the Lord Mayor of Dublin from 1900 to 1901.

Pile had an older sister and two younger brothers. His youngest brother, Cyril John Pile, served in the Royal Flying Corps during the First World War, and was killed in action in 1917.

Pile was commissioned into the Royal Artillery in 1904. He initially served in India.

Military career 

Pile served in the First World War and was involved in the retreat from Mons and was a Staff Captain with 1st Division before becoming a Brigade Major with 40th Division in 1916. In the closing stages of the War he became a General Staff Officer with 22nd Corps in France. He was married in 1915, mentioned in dispatches, and awarded both the Military Cross and the Distinguished Service Order during the war.

After the war he was appointed a Brigade Major at Brighton and Shoreham District. He attended the Staff College, Camberley from 1922 to 1923 and transferred to the Royal Tank Corps (later the Royal Tank Regiment) in 1923. In 1928 he became Commander of the 1st Experimental Mechanized Force and Assistant Director of Mechanisation at the War Office. He went to Egypt in 1932 as Commander of the Canal Brigade Mechanized Force.

In 1937 he became General Officer Commanding 1st Anti Aircraft Division. Even before the war started, he foresaw the likely pressures on personnel and investigated whether women would be capable to taking a part in anti-aircraft batteries. He invited Caroline Haslett of the Women's Engineering Society to spend several weekends observing the work of a battery in Surrey and she advised him that women would certainly be able to do the work, as proved to be the case during the war. In 1939, at the start of the Second World War, he was made General Officer Commanding-in-Chief of Anti-Aircraft Command, a position he held throughout the war. He was the only British general to retain the same command throughout the entire war. After Dunkirk he issued a General Order telling his men that they were the only British troops still firing at the enemy. He was to tell the story after the war, in his official dispatch and in his book Ack-Ack: Britain's Defence against Air Attack during the Second World War. His plan for "Engagement of Long Range Rockets with AA Gunfire" (gunfire into a radar-predicted airspace to intercept the V-2 rocket) was ready on 21 March 1945 but the plan was not used due to the danger of shells falling on Greater London.

Tim Pile was considered as CIGS to replace John Dill in October 1941 at Beaverbrook's urging (Pile had been spending weekends with Beaverbrook). Alan Brooke who replaced Dill said that “Tim” Pile had certain valuable qualities but he could not think of a worse selection as CIGS.    

Pile was created a Knight Grand Cross of the Order of the Bath (GCB) in the 1945 New Year Honours. After the War he became Director General of Housing with the Ministry of Works.

He was also Colonel Commandant of the Royal Artillery from 1945 to 1952.

Personal life 
In 1915 Pile married Vera Millicent Lloyd, with whom he had two sons, Frederick Devereux Pile (1915–2010) and John Devereux Pile (1918–1982). In 1932 he married Hester Mary Melba Phillimore. In 1951, he married Molly Eveline Louise Mary Home.

Pile's elder son, Frederick Pile, served as a major in the Royal Tank Regiment. He won the Military Cross during the British Army's advance into Germany in 1945. He was later promoted to colonel and succeeded to the baronetcy on his father's death in 1976.

Commemoration 

In 1948, a locomotive of the Southern Railway SR Battle of Britain Class was named after Pile at Waterloo station in London. After residing at Woodham Brothers scrapyard in Barry, South Wales it was initially preserved at the Avon Valley Railway for many years, and then moved to the Watercress Line in 2011. Hornby Railways have released a model of this locomotive.

Arms

References

Bibliography

External links
British Army Officers 1939−1945
Generals of World War II

1884 births
1976 deaths
Royal Tank Regiment officers
Baronets in the Baronetage of the United Kingdom
British Army generals of World War II
British Army personnel of World War I
Anti-Aircraft Command officers
Commanders of the Legion of Merit
Companions of the Distinguished Service Order
Graduates of the Royal Military Academy, Woolwich
Knights Grand Cross of the Order of the Bath
Graduates of the Staff College, Camberley
Military personnel from Dublin (city)
Recipients of the Military Cross
Royal Artillery officers
People educated at Weymouth College (public school)
British Army generals